Mamod is a British toy manufacturer that specializes in manufacturing live steam models. The company was founded in Birmingham by Geoffrey Malins in 1937. The name is a portmanteau of Malins Models. The first models produced were of stationary steam engines, originally sold under the 'Hobbies' brand name. Malins soon switched to selling them under the name 'Mamod.' The company later began creating models of road rollers, traction engines, steam wagons, and other steam road vehicles. These models were aimed at the toy market, so they were simple to operate and ran at low boiler pressures for safety but were not accurate scale models.

Most Mamod models use oscillating cylinders, usually single-acting. Some of these engines have regulators in either the steam feed or exhaust, but many others run unregulated (in the simpler models) or have a simple reversing mechanism to alter the cutoff, thus controlling the power/speed and direction of the engine. Early models had single or multi-wick lamps or vaporizing spirit burners, but in the mid-1970s the company changed to hexamine solid fuel which came in tablet form and provided low heat in a relatively safe form.

SC, SE and Minor series stationary engines (1937–79)

The SE range has its origins in 1936 when Geoffrey Malins started to make engines for Hobbies of Dereham. His engines were loosely based on the Bowman engines that Geoffrey Bowman Jenkins had made for Hobbies until 1935. The main difference between the Bowman and the Malins was that the latter were smaller, came only on metal bases and all, except the SE1, had the chimney attached to the top of the boiler, known as a locomotive style chimney. From 1937, Malins decided to make his own range of engines as well as those he was producing for Hobbies. With the exception of a few small detail changes – such as lighter shade of paints and a Mamod badge – they were almost identical to the Hobbies' range. The difference between Mamod and Hobbies became somewhat blurred; a Mamod badged SE4 could be found in the 'Hobbies colours'. This was the very beginnings of a philosophy which meant that the engines had to be sold and out the door. Unsold engines meant lost profit and so nothing was wasted. Any differences between the two ranges had all but disappeared by 1940.

With the onset of the Second World War, Malins's association with Hobbies firm in Dereham came to an end, and the SC series of engines were the last steam toys to be sold under the Hobbies mark. Malins had also realised he could make much more money by concentrating on his own engines. With hostilities increasing, the St. Mary Row factory was put into mothballs and war interests took over, although Geoffrey Malins did continue to make limited numbers of engines throughout the war

After the war the business was revived, and by 1946, a limited range of steam toys was being made – the SE1, SE2, Minor 1 and tools. The pre-war SE3 and SE4 were dropped along with the short-lived twin cylinder Minor 2. Apart from the Minor 1 (now usually called MM1), the engines made in immediate post-war period had base-mounted chimneys. The boiler-mounted chimney soon returned though, during 1946. In all other respects the engines were the same as before the war. The SE1 and SE2 were produced only in this form for a few months; post war rationing meant that it was harder to replace materials used in production and so the SE1 and SE2 changed back to the locomotive style chimney. Apart from colour changes, the MM1 continued almost unchanged. Until 1948, the tools still used flat bases and cast iron bodies. 

By 1948 the SE range had received its first real update. Mamod branded brass engine frames and hot-stamped brass flywheels were introduced and the SE1 and SE2 each received a regulator as well. 
Also introduced was the new Minor 2 (MM2). This had a single cylinder engine unit and was a larger version of the MM1. All engines continued to use wick burners with either 1, 2 or 3 wick tubes. 
By 1949, with the move to Camden Street, the firm had acquired a pressing facility and the expensive brass engine frames were replaced with pressed steel ones. The design was similar to those found on some Marklin engines. The boilers on the SE1 and SE2 now had superheating. The SE2 retained its regulator but the SE1 lost its. The MM1 engine became the first engine in the range to have a raised pressed base. The range remained in this form until 1953 when, with the introduction of cheaper Mazak as a material, the brass flywheels were gradually replaced. This is typical of the Malins Engineers' approach in ensuring that the models were always updated and changed to keep the price as competitive as possible. In that immediate post-war period, there were many other manufacturers making steam toys, such as Plane Products, Cyldon, SEL, Luton Bowman and Burnac.

At the start of 1954, the SE range all received raised bases as well as cosmetic updates and changes. By 1958 all but the MM1 had received the new vaporising spirit burners, which had first appeared in 1957 with the introduction of the all-new twin cylinder SE3. Again there was another round of cosmetic changes with updated boiler bands and fireboxes. Combinations of these old and new parts can be found in the 'transitional' engines of the late 1950s period (e.g. the SE1, 2 and MM2). By the mid-1960s the engines were using pop rivets for the engine frame securing method (along with the entire Mamod range) as well more cosmetic changes. In 1967, the SE range received its next major update with the introduction of the SE1a and SE2a replacing the SE1 and 2. The superheating was gone and the simplified pipework was all new. The SE2a also got a reversing lever like the 'MEC1' Meccano engine of 1965. Other details such as paint colour, boiler end cap and whistle design as well as decal layout were gradually changed. 

One point worth mentioning is the fact that from 1967 until about 1972, the Se1, 2 and 3 could be found with different green paint on their engine frames. This paint was similar to a hammered effect type finish and was most likely purchased as a job lot by the Managing Director at the time, Eric Malins. Steve Malins has confirmed that this was the case and his father would try anything new or changes which made production cheaper. The Minor range never received this paint finish. The SE3 was unchanged bar the introduction of the Griffin and George (educational suppliers) version in 1969. This engine was the only real variation to Mamod's biggest post-war stationary engine. It featured the very first silver soldered boiler (at the insistence of G&G) and also had a steam pipe union nut at the boiler instead of the usual stop cock. It carried an extra foil G&G lozenge logo by the engine as well. About 2,000 were made until about mid-1970s. It was sold only to schools and came complete with a comprehensive manual for using the engine in laboratory experiments. Later examples of this engine were standard SE3s but carrying a revised G&G logo of a different design. This Griffin badge could sometimes be found placed alongside the warning labels applied to all stationary engines in 1976 explaining the use of inappropriate fuel containers and refuelling techniques.

The 1970s were the heyday of Malins Engineers. The MM1 received a vaporizing burner in 1970, both Minors got overflow plugs in 1975, the engines were converted to solid fuel in 1977 for the domestic market (it had happened earlier for export) and, in 1978, the entire range (except for the MM1) received sight glasses on the boiler instead of the overflow plug. By the late 1970s the range was looking tired and so, with considerable investment from the Malins family, in 1979 the SE range was superseded by the SP range.

In general, the SP models are modernised versions of the earlier SE models, the changes being for safety as well as cosmetic reasons. There is no strict correspondence between models in the SE and SP ranges. A rough comparison between the ranges can be seen in the following table:

Meccano engine

Between 1965 and 1976, Malins produced a steam engine to the requirements of the Meccano company, which was the label it was sold under. It had a special base designed to facilitate building the engine into Meccano models. It incorporated a mechanism which shifted the cylinder in relation to the inlet and exhaust, allowing it to run in reverse.

After the Meccano branded version was discontinued, the same engine, with minor modifications, was later sold under the Mamod brand as the SP3. The original Meccano branded version never had an official name or model number but it is now commonly called the MEC1.

The SP Range 1979–to date

SP1

The SP1 was based on the Mamod Minor 1 which it replaced and which had been in production since 1939. It had the same boiler, similar engine unit and flywheel to the non-crank disc types. The main differences were that it had a new black die-cast chimney and a narrow solid fuel burner design to take one tablet broken in half. This was also the only SP engine to feature a water plug as the boiler was too small to fit the standard Mamod water sight glass. The firebox remained the same as the older Minor 1. Some were built with the old Mamod Minor 1 boiler. The exhaust was a simple open port as on the Minor 2 and MEC1 engines. These engines with limited power and torque could drive at least 1 or 2 miniature tools.
The SP1 was discontinued in 1985 after 27,500 had been produced.

SP2 and SP2D

The SP2 was an all-new design introduced in 1979. It replaced the Mamod Minor 2 and was similar to it in a few ways. It had the same type of boiler as the Minor 2 as well as the engine unit and frame. The exhaust was a simple open port like the Minor 2.  The SP2D is a version of the SP2 with an integral dynamo. The SP2D has a larger-diameter flywheel which drives the dynamo – mounted inside the base of the chimney – by a belt. A small LED bulb is fitted to the top of the chimney. These were powerful engines for their size and could drive a full workshop of four tools quite easily.

The SP2 models are still in production; 36,878 had been produced by 1995.

Minor variations in the type:
 Early engine frames were painted blue, later into the 80s this was changed to black
 Some sight glasses were secured by screws as opposed to pop rivets
 Sight glass cover could be a silver metal or brass

SP3

The SP3 was based on the MEC1 Meccano engine, which first appeared in 1965. It was basically the same except for a solid fuel burner, sight glass, a whistle instead of the steam dome and plastic gears, instead of metal ones, on the crank shaft for driving Meccano models. The exhaust was a simple open port in the engine frame as per the MEC1 and the engine carried two makers' marks — a Mamod and a Meccano type scalloped edge decal. The baseplate was silver painted and the boiler was a standard Mamod drawn type tube as used on the SP2, SP4 and SR1a. The SP3 could drive the whole series of workshop tools.

Minor variations in the type:
 Reverser handles were red or black
 The crank web usually painted black some examples bare metal
 Some sight glasses were secured by screws instead of pop rivets
 Some sight glass covers were silver metal instead of brass

SP4 and SP4D

The SP4 was the mid-range engine in the SP series. It featured the standard Mamod drawn boiler and die cast chimney. The engine frame for this model was mounted on a silver plinth, and the unit had a reverser which allowed the engine to run in either a reverse or forward direction. It could drive a good selection of tools simultaneously, using a lineshaft, and it also featured "exhaust to chimney".  The boiler was heated using the two-tablet burner tray as on the SP2 and 3, and a whistle was also included on it. The SP4D variant had a uni-directional engine unit and carried a larger pulley to drive a dynamo connected to a small 3v lamp.

Minor variations in the type:
 Some sight glasses were secured by screws as opposed to 2 pop rivets
 Some sight covers could be a silver metal or brass
 The SP4D version sported a dynamo and an additional extra large pulley (on the same shaft) using a standard flywheel. It had no reverse control lever.

SP5 Mk1 and Mk2
The SP5 was the top-of-the-range engine when it was introduced. It had a longer boiler –  – and a twin-cylinder engine unit with a reverse control. The engines could easily drive several workshops due to their bigger boiler and twin cylinders. The engine, like the SP4, had the exhaust to chimney with condensate collector at the base of the chimney. The engine unit, like the SP4 was mounted on a plinth, a possible throw back to the SE4 prototype of 1946. The crank webs had the word Mamod stamped into them like the old SE3 it replaced. The boiler was heated using a 3-tablet burner pan, a whistle was also included in the specification.

The new model of SP5, Mk2 1335, produced since 2000, has several differences from the Mk1. The whole layout of this model has been changed. The positions of the components are in reverse: e.g. the cylinders and chimney are now on the left-hand side. Also, the left-hand end of the crankshaft has the usual counterweight type of crank as on the SP5 Mk1, SE3 Twin and other engines, but the right-hand end of the new SP5 Mk2's crankshaft has a more efficient and far more attractive crank disc for better balance and smoother running. Furthermore, this engine has one-piece cylinders; the bore being 8 mm (5/16 inch), and stroke 19 mm (3/4 inch). The SP5D Mk2 model comes fitted with a belt-driven dynamo and bulb holder, although a version without the dynamo is also available.

Minor variations in the type:
 Some sight glasses were secured by screws as opposed to pop rivets
 Some sight covers could be silver-  or  brass-coloured metal
 A version was also sold to Griffin and George who distributed it to schools and educational purposes. These engines carried an extra G&G decal.  (A badged SP4 version can also be found). It was not silver soldered.

SP6

The single-cylinder SP6 1338 is one of the most powerful engines Mamod have produced, and is fitted with a piston valve and fixed cylinder rather than an oscillating cylinder. It uses the same boiler/burner unit as the SP5 Mk2 1335 (optionally fitted with a pressure gauge). The same engine block has been used on the larger mobile models. Originally introduced in 2006, production of this model is still ongoing.

Minor variations in the type:
 A limited edition version was made for Forest Classics around 2006. This engine featured a green baseplate.

SP7
The twin-cylinder SP7 is the most powerful engine Mamod have produced, and is like the SP6 in the range, but is fitted with twin cylinders. It uses the same boiler/burner unit as the SP6 (fitted with a pressure gauge). The SP7 was introduced in 2009, and was available by special order only, but they stopped making them in 2018.

SP8
The SP8 is Mamod's first beam engine. Introduced in 2013, it uses the same double-acting piston valve cylinder (as used in other recent models) which is mounted vertically under one end of the beam connected to it, using a simulated Watts linkage. The crankshaft and flywheel are mounted under the other end; the valve gear is controlled via a second smaller beam. The SP8 is offered with optional gas or solid fuel burner. Now discontinued.

Mamod miniature tools and line shaft details

The company produced a range of model workshop equipment with either cast iron or diecast metal bodies and bases designed to be compatible with Meccano (½ inch (12.7 mm) spacing). The range comprised:
 Model Power Press (later called Power Punch)
 Model Power Hammer – a trip hammer
 Miniature Polishing Machine – with two  inch felt polishing wheels
 Miniature Grinding Machine – with one fine and one medium  inch grinding wheels.
 Miniature Line Shaft – enabling several models to be run at one time, fitted with three Meccano-compatible pulleys
The tools have featured in the Mamod range of steam toys since the company's inception in 1937. Very early tools featured simple flat bases with Meccano-spaced holes. These early tools also had Meccano-like pulleys, fitted with crudely-made sand cast iron bodies. They continued after the war in the pre-war form until 1948 when, along with the SE1, SE2 and MM2 engines the hammer and Power Punch (later "Power Press") they were fitted with the new hot stamped brass flywheels. At the same time Malins Engineers moved to Camden Street, Birmingham. With this move the company acquired some power presses, and the new brass-wheeled tools (and polisher/grinder) began to get raised bases. 
The cast iron bodies for all the tools were replaced with Mazak around 1950. The pressing facilities also enabled the MM1 engine to be the first steam toy in the Malins' range to be produced with a raised baseplate. Apart from the change from brass to Mazak flywheels in 1953 and the disappearance of oiling points by the 1960s, the tools changed very little over the years. By 1979 the tools had changed to a blue and red colour scheme (replacing the green/red scheme used on all the engines and tools up until then) inline with the new SP series of engines. Due to the financial situation, the tools, as separate items, disappeared from the range in the mid-1980s (along with the SP1, 3 and 5) but were together in the WS1 workshop introduced in 1979. Then, in the early 2000s, the individual tools re-appeared.

The Mamod lineshaft history 
The line shaft is the accessory that enables a steam engine to drive more than one tool. The line shaft first appeared back in 1936 when Geoffrey Malins took on the task of making a set of engines for Hobbies of Dereham, after Geoffrey Bowman-Jenkins left Bowman models. The early line shafts all featured flatbases and, before the war, came in two models: the C1 and the C2; the former having 4 pulleys and the latter having 7. Both types of line shaft carried the Meccano-type red pulleys as well as turned brass types. The pedestal supports, like those of the early tools, were made from cast iron and the baseplates were drilled to fit Meccano. Production of the line shaft and the tools continued right up to the beginning of Second World War  (and possibly into 1940), the line shaft by then being incorporated into the SC2, 3 and 4 engines. After the war (c1948) the line shaft gained brass pulleys as well as the hammer and punch. The flat base plate was retained but the C1 line shaft was dropped. By the mid-1980s the Mamod company was in trouble; the SP1, 3 and 5 were discontinued, along with the separate tools and line shaft, but all five components continued to be made as part of the WS workshop.

Mobile Engine Range 1961–to date
Mamod produces a wide range of models capable of moving under their own power. They are mainly generic representations of various vehicles that were often steam powered in the past.

Steamroller SR1 and SR1A

The SR1 steam roller was Mamod's first mobile steam toy. It was introduced in January 1961, designed by Eric Malins. The first rollers were unidirectional and only travelled in a 'forward' direction (at an un-steam roller like speed). The engines featured a modified MM2 steam unit complete with characteristic rolls made of aluminium alloy. Like the early TE1s of 1963 and the stationary range, the early SR1 rollers were of screwed-together construction and also featured a brass vaporising lamp rivetted to the scuttle. They had no towing hook. From 1963, a revised burner was used (as was introduced with the TE1 steam tractor), the handle of which formed a towing hook; although it would be 1969 before there was anything for it to tow, with the introduction of the OW1 Open Wagon and LB1 Lumber Wagon. From 1965 the roller was put together using pop rivets (like all the Mamod range of steam toys) – as a result it is easy to distinguish early 1960s rollers from later ones. In 1967 the SR1 became the SR1a, with the introduction of a simple reversing mechanism on the engine unit. The mechanism was similar to the 1965 MEC1 Meccano engine. In the same way, the TE1 became a TE1a. In 1968 the aluminium rollers and wheels were replaced by Mazak items; the same material is used to this day. The roller has remained in the Mamod range for over 60 years now but has undergone small incremental changes over this time, with modifications to the burner (moving to solid fuel circa 1976) and sight glass boilers replacing the over flow plug type (circa 1978). The only other changes have been largely cosmetic: paint, whistles, smoke box detailing. Early boxed SR1 engines now command strong prices and are sometimes referred to as "nut and bolt" SRs by collectors. Lately, other variations of roller have included limited editions in different colours as well as longer boiler versions and also a kit version. The 60th anniversary of the introduction of the SR1 was celebrated in 2021 with a limited production run of 60.

Traction Engine TE1 and TE1A

This is the 'classic' Mamod model and has been in production with minor updates and modifications for over 50 years. It is a model of a typical traction engine with a full-length canopy. The engine itself is an oscillating-cylinder unit, the same as the SR1/a which is based on the old MM2 unit. The boiler is longer than that on the SR1 although it is the same volume internally. The front part is an empty void into which, in the earlier versions, the exhaust steam was fed through the choke (it controlled the exiting steam not the inlet steam). The TE1a differs from the TE1 in having a reversing lever to control the speed and direction of the model (initially used on the MEC1 of 1965 and subsequently applied to the TE in 1967), whereas the TE1 was uni-directional only with an exhaust 'choke' to control the speed. The TE1 was claimed to cover a third of a mile in ten minutes on a single filling. Power is delivered to the back axle by means of a drive band running from a small pulley on the flywheel to the rim of one of the back wheels. This can be removed to allow the engine to run stationary or to drive a lineshaft and tools. The front axle of the model is mounted on a central pivot with a simple copper stub spring, which provides a crude form of suspension. It is also steerable, by means of a shaft running from the axle up inside the chimney (later models post 67). Early models did not use the later control rod for steering but used a rod mounted directly into a hole in the early model square axle box. Both designs could be screwed down to lock the wheels in a fixed position. A control rod, with a wooden handle on top, can be attached to the top of this shaft to allow the operator to steer the model as it moves. The TE1/A has a green boiler (this green has varied over the years from apple green to a dark brunswick green, similar to GWR locomotives), red spoked wheels and flywheel, a white/cream coloured canopy and a black firebox/smokebox/chimney. It is also available in a distinctive alternative paint scheme, with a polished brass boiler and maroon wheels. Other limited edition models have been produced in the last decade using blue or black paintwork, as well of variations of the colours mentioned already.

Steam Wagon SW1

The SW1 steam Wagon is another variation of the SR/TE engines in the range and was first produced in 1972. The model is largely attributed to Steve Malins, grandson of the founder of Malins Engineers. Apparently Steve took his inspiration from a book entitled 'The overtype steam road waggon' (Published in 1971 and written by Maurice A. Kelly). The SW1 basically uses a mixture of components from the SR1a roller and TE1a traction engines to which is attached a lorry-style rear body with a cab and payload bed. The extra length of body is supported on a C section girder 'chassis'. The engine has a double reduced drive using a large intermediate pulley, similar to the flywheel. This gives a more realistic speed as well as affording the model more pulling power. A live rear axle (only one wheel is driven) has distinctive diamond-spoked wheels (closely based on a Foden design. The wagon is sometimes referred to as the 'Foden Wagon'). The model has red wheels and a blue, green or brown body, with a white quarter-length canopy over the engine and boiler. The model has details such as mudguards and an optional cargo of 'barrels'. More recently, limited edition models have been made in a darker shade of green as well as black. Other variations to the SW1 include a blue version of the model, with white lettering on the rear payload body as opposed to the standard gold lettering. An alternative colour scheme is carried by the SW1B model. Here, the model has deep brown bodywork and cream wheels. Recently, a limited edition version was produced for Forest Classics using an all black colour scheme. 100 were produced. The steam wagon is still in production to-day (2012) and is still regarded by many as the company's finest mobile. 

Early steam wagons were produced in green, with a meths vaporising burner. Around 1977, they adopted the solid fuel pan burners and by 1978 had a sight glass instead of the usual over-flow plug, with blue paint replacing the green. In the early 2000s the brown version was produced. The engine is fitted with the usual spring-loaded whistle as well as steering gear from the TE1a. The rear scuttle, set up for holding the burner, is exactly the same as on the SR and TE models, but it fits snugly between the two girder chassis parts.

An updated limited edition of the steam wagon was issued in 2022 to commemorate the 50th anniversary of the original introduction.

Showman's Engine
This is another model based on the TE1A in the form of a showman's road locomotive. Like the real-life showmans' engines, it uses the basic form of a traction engine with the addition of a dynamo and a few aesthetic details. The Showman's model has twisted-brass canopy supports, a (non-functional) chain-steering drum and a typical bright paint scheme with a maroon boiler and yellow wheels. The main mechanical differences between the Showman's and the TE1A are the dynamo and the fitting of a solid flywheel to the former model. The dynamo is mounted over the smokebox and powers a series of LEDs fitted around the canopy. It is driven by a drive band from the flywheel.

'Centurion' TE1AC
The 'Centurion' is a larger, more powerful version of the TE1A model, but fitted with Mamod's piston valve engine (as used on the SP6–SP8 engines). In other respects it is the same as the earlier model, with the same layout and green/red colour scheme.

'Challenger' SR1AC
The 'Challenger' is the steamroller version of 'Centurion'. As with the other rollers, it has been adapted by having an extended front frame carrying the front roller and larger solid rear wheels. Unlike the earlier steamroller model, it has a full-length canopy like the traction engine models.

Showman's Special
This is the Showman's version of the 'Centurion' model. It has the same added details as the TE1A-based Showman's model and the same colour scheme.

Roadster SA1

This is a model of a two-seater roadster style car, possibly based on the look and style of a Mercer Raceabout from the early 20th century. The model first appeared in late 1976  and was designed by Steve Malins with input from George Morris. The first versions were finished in red and white with black upholstery (still available) although newer versions have recently appeared with green/brass or burgundy/brass finishes. A silver 4-seater limousine, based on the Roadster, is also a popular model appearing in the 1980s. The boiler cover forms the 'bonnet' of the car with the sight-glass for checking the water level being the 'radiator grille'. Early versions sported the traditional overflow plug, which was replaced by the sight glass in 1978 to conform with the new Euro Toy Regulations. The earliest Roadsters were meths fired, appearing in late 1976.  From about 1977, all models used a steel pan-type solid fuel burner, although the older steel pan meths burners still fitted. The oscillating-cylinder engine is mounted externally on the left-hand side of the model and incorporates a simple forward and reverse lever like that used on the SE2a and MEC1 stationary engines. The unit drives (via a shaft) a small solid flywheel, mounted externally on the right-hand side. Again, a distinguishing feature of early models is the 'split-drive' with final drive on the left-hand side, as opposed to later (and current) models where the drive is all on the right. This shaft drives the rear axle by a power band. This arrangement allows a slightly higher road speed than the SW1 wagon, but makes the model much slower than the TE1 traction engine (which was ridiculously too fast). This chassis and layout is used on other mobiles in the Mamod ranges such as the LB1 London 'bus,  FE1 fire engine,  SA1L limousine as well as the DV1/2 vans. The early wheels are in the style of wooden carriage wheels (as found on cars of the period – these were known as artillery wheels), with solid rubber tyres. Later models used a re-designed wheel which was based upon the design used for the Rolls-Royce Silver Ghost. Details such as running boards, spare wheel and carriage lamps are also fitted.

Silver Limousine SA1L
This is a model of an Edwardian-style limousine, similar to the Rolls-Royce Silver Ghost. It is finished in grey/silver paint with black upholstery and hood, and is based on the SA1.

The Limo is also available in a different colour scheme, with maroon bodywork and brass/gold wheels. This is designated the SA1B.

Fire Engine FE1
The model uses the standard chassis with front-mounted boiler and mid-mounted oscillating engine, but the rear body carries a turntable ladder, complete with exposed cranking wheels. The model is painted bright red with polished chromework, and is similar in appearance to fire engines produced by Leyland in the 1920s.

Delivery Van DV1 and DV2
This model represents a typical British light commercial vehicle of the interwar period. It has an enclosed rear body with twin rear-opening doors and an open driving position. It is painted dark green (DV1) or dark blue (DV2) with brass detailing and carries a Mamod livery.

Post Office Van PO1
This is based on the DV1 model, but has an extended rear body and an enclosed driving position. Like real Post Office vans of the period, it is painted red with black mudguards, wheels and bonnet. It carries the 'GR' royal insignia, presumably dating it to the reign of King George V.

Le Mans Racer LM1
This model represents a typical Edwardian or interwar 2-seat racing car used for long distance races such as the Le Mans 24 Hour Race. Whilst using the same basic chassis and layout as the Roadster and Limo, it has a two-cylinder uni-directional engine, with external cylinders on each side of the chassis to provide more power. It has an open 'cockpit' with an aerodynamic sloped rear end. It is painted with either red or blue (and two off in Green, very rare) bodywork, including fenders and wheels, with a chrome boiler cowl. It carries the racing number '12'.  Although the model uses the same running gear and pistons as the other engines in the range, it is actually the fastest in the mobile Mamod lineup. This particular model is suitable for a radio control receiver to be fitted, to control the steering mechanism.

London Bus LB1
Introduced in 1989 as the flagship of the Mamod Mobile Range, the London Bus is based on an early double-decker design such as the LGOC X-type. It carries the livery of the London General Omnibus Company and carried Mamod adverts in the style of the Edwardian period. It has red bodywork and black wheels, shares the distinctive spoked rear wheels with the Steam Wagon model (see above) and has an open top deck with an open rear staircase. It is available also in a green livery.

Mamod Meteor and Conqueror boats
These two models were commercially unsuccessful and were only produced for a short time. The Meteor was a steam-powered boat in the style of a Second World War torpedo boat and sold about 1,500 units. The Conqueror was an electrically powered version of the Meteor using a FROG Revmaster motor. Both models used the same hull which was of all steel construction. The Meteor used a single cylinder engine similar to the ME1. The Conqueror used a battery instead, with a slight re-designed inner hull accommodating the 4 D type cells in a metal holder. The motor itself drove the stern tube prop-shaft by means of a spring steel belt and pulley. It was Mamod's only venture into electrical power but was even less successful than the Meteor, selling about 200 units for the same price as the steam version. Both models were dropped in 1952, making them much sought after by collectors.

ME1, ME2 and ME3 Marine Steam Engines

Despite the failure of the Mamod Meteor and Conqueror boats (1949–52) Malins Engineers introduced the ME1 (similar to the pre-war ME1 but with a vapourising spirit lamp) and the ME2 in 1958.
The manufacturer claimed about fifteen minutes of fast steaming per filling. The engines were finished in polished brass, chromium plate and red and green paint, with a methylated spirit vapourising spirit lamp providing the heat source.

The cylinder size was  stroke by 5/16 inch (8 mm) bore, driving a two-bladed  diameter propeller.

The ME2 was introduced in 1958 at the same time as the ME1. Dimensions of this engine are the same as the ME3, except that it had a Mamod upright engine as opposed to the SEL upright engine used in the ME3. The ME2 was not particularly successful and was replaced by the ME3 in 1965. The fact that the ME1 represented a complete engine unit, whilst the ME2 basically was the boiler and engine unit probably worked against their success.

The ME3 was basically similar to the ME2 equipped with a heavier duty engine unit (an SEL 1560 Steam Launch Unit) designed to turn a bigger propeller. The unit used the ME1 boiler but, with a stroke of ½ in (12.5 mm) and a bore of 7/16 in (11 mm), the engine could drive a  diameter three-bladed propeller through a dogged pulley arrangement – as opposed to the stern tube system used by the ME1. Like most of the marine engines made by Mamod, the SEL engine lacked a lubricator and needed careful setting up to work correctly. The ME3 was in production from 1965 to 1972, by which time (and after 2,700 units) all the SEL engines that Malins Engineers had purchased at a knock-down price from J & L Randall (parent of the SEL brand) had been used up.

Mamod Steam Railway

In late 1979 Mamod introduced its first model railway, the O gauge live steam SL-1 locomotive, along with a small range of rolling stock and track. The model was of a narrow gauge railway and, although it was not based on a specific prototype, it was to approximately 16 mm scale, thus representing approximately a  gauge railway.

The Mamod Steam Railway, as it was known, was the first cheap, mass-produced live steam set in the United Kingdom and it sold well. Mamod quickly increased the range with further locomotives, the SL-2 and SL-3, available in ready-to-run and kit-form and in both O (32 mm) and 1 (45 mm) gauges. The locomotives used a pair of double acting, oscillating cylinders connected to a rotary reversing valve. This, in theory, allowed the locos to run slowly, and to 'self start'. Special edition locomotives, further rolling stock and points were also made. The current range consists of re-designed versions, although still in the same basic configuration. Many upgrades, both mechanical and cosmetic, are available to upgrade Mamod locomotives.

In 2006, two other companies were producing models based on the original Mamod locomotive designs:
 MSS (Mamod Sales and Services) continues to manufacture and sell the basic locomotive and stock, as well as a new saddle tank model introduced in 2004.
Mamod Steam Models produces a wide range of Mamod models including an upgraded version of the SL-1 locomotive design with improved running gear.

In addition, the basic design of the Mamod has inspired several improved versions supplied by independent manufacturers. Notable amongst there are the Creekside Forge & Foundry Baldwin, the PPS Janet and the IP Engineering Jane. Several manufacturers also supply upgraded components for the original Mamod line. A particularly popular upgrade was to fit the locomotive with a Methylated spirit burner which produced greater heat and therefore allowed higher boiler pressure and greater hauling capacity.

An experiment in making a cheap loco was the "Harry the Rocket". The name was misleading in that the loco was nothing like Stephenson's loco of the same name. It was an unsuccessful experiment and sold so few that it has now become collectable. A later, more successful offering was the "Brunel" vertical boilered engine.  Again, this is a misnomer because it is based on the De-Winton style of engines, common in Welsh slate quaries. This model is still available.

Malins Engineers in receivership
The company went into receivership in 1980, mainly due to the fact that the financial outlay both on the SP series of engine and the new RS1 and RS2 railway sets had been considerable. Many companies in the early 1980s were experiencing financial difficulties, and banks were calling in loans and finance agreements at the time because of the economic downturn. Malins  Engineers'  bank asked Malins to repay some of the money, giving the company the weekend to raise the cash. The company was unable to raise the money and so went into administration, though it was trading in the black within a few weeks, with the new railway sets selling well. Eric Malins, the Managing Director and Steve Malins, his son, gave up control of the company, thus effectively ending the Malins' family relationship with Mamod.

Since then the company has had a chequered existence with six owners and manufacturing bases. The company nearly went out of existence in 1989. It is currently in the ownership of the Terry family, and is now based near its original home at Smethwick in the West Midlands. The company now produces a wide range of mobile engines, stationary models and machine tools as well as gauge O and 1 railway locomotives.

Related Companies
The large number and low cost of Mamod models means they are still popular today. There is a thriving market in spare and replacement parts from a variety of small manufacturers. Second-hand models are cheap and readily available and are often used as the basis for conversions by modellers.

Running and lubrication requirements
Most Mamod engines lack lubricators to store oil and feed it to moving parts, such as the piston and bearings. The very early pre-war engines such as the SE3/4 and some of the marine engines (including the Meteor boat) were the only ones to have them. Instead, oil is applied manually to the necessary parts before each run.

Up until 1976/77 all Mamod engines used methylated spirits (known as "denatured alcohol" in some countries), which was either stored in a reservoir burner or vaporising spirit lamp. With the introduction of stricter health and safety laws and the European Toy regulations, the use of liquid fuel for use in steam toys in the UK was outlawed from 1977. Malins decided to switch to solid fuel after the infamous 'exploding fuel lamp' story of 1976 The engines were then 'converted' to burn dry Hexamine fuel tablet in redesigned burner trays which, at the time, Malins manufactured on their own premises.  The solid fuel is, in some respects, much safer than "meths".  While burning, however, it gives off unpleasant and toxic fumes and a reduced level of heat. New models are now designed to use butane gas burners. This is likely to become the norm following restrictions on posting (mailing) flammable substances, including solid fuel tablets. Butane gas is easily available in DIY stores.

When steaming a Mamod model, distilled or soft, clean water should always be used.

See also
Wilesco
Jensen Steam Engines
MiniSteam

Notes

References
 Malins, P.S. (1996) Mamod: The Story of Malins Models, Mamod Sales & Service,

External links

 website of Mamod Ltd
 Mamod at ToySteamBible.org

Toy train manufacturers
Toy brands
Toy steam engine manufacturers
Companies based in Smethwick
1937 establishments in the United Kingdom